For All Eternity, formed in 2008, is an Australian metalcore band from Sydney, NSW. The band independently released an extended play, For All Eternity, in 2009. Their first studio album, Beyond the Gates, was released in 2012 with Taperjean Records and Shock Records. Their second studio album, Metanoia, was released with Facedown Records in 2015. This album would be their Billboard magazine breakthrough release on the Christian Albums and Heatseekers Albums charts.

Background
For All Eternity is a hardcore and metal band from Sydney, NSW, Australia. Their members are vocalist Shane Carroll, drummer and vocalist Michael Buckley, guitarists Jeremy Mosiejczuk and Nicholas Page, and bassist Scott Dibley. Former members include guitarist Andrew Comale and bassists Nathanael Edwards and Gavin Bain.

Music history
The band commenced as a musical entity in August 2008, with their first release, an extended play, For All Eternity, which they released independently in 2009. Their first studio album, Beyond the Gates, was released in tandem with Shock Records alongside Taperjean Records on 24 August 2012. Their subsequent studio album, Metanoia, was released on 10 July 2015 by Facedown Records, and this just happened to be the first ever worldwide release date for albums. This album was their breakthrough release upon the Billboard magazine charts, where it peaked on the Christian Albums chart at No. 23, while it peaked at No. 21 on the Heatseekers Albums chart. Vocalist Shane Carroll stated that Vasely Sapunov of Saving Grace is who got the band placed on the label roster.

Members
Current members
 Shane Carroll – vocals (2008–present), clean vocals (2017–present)
 Michael Buckley – drums, clean vocals (2008–present)
 Jeremy Mosiejczuk – guitar  (2008–present)
 Nicholas Page – guitar (2011–present)
 Scott Dibley – bass guitar (2011–present)

Former members
 Andrew Comale – guitar (2010–2011)
 Gavin Bain – bass guitar (2010–2011)
 Nathanael Edwards – bass guitar (2008–2010)

Timeline

Discography

Studio albums

EPs
 For All Eternity (2009, Independent)

References

External links
 Facebook page
 Facedown Records

Australian heavy metal musical groups
2008 establishments in Australia
Musical groups established in 2008
Facedown Records artists
Australian Christian metal musical groups
Christian metal musical groups